Mokra Gora, meaning the Wet Mountain in English, is a village located in the city of Užice, southwestern Serbia. It is situated on the northern slopes of the Zlatibor mountains. Emphasis on historical reconstruction has made it into a popular tourist center with unique attractions.

Mokra Gora has become popular after 2003 reconstruction of a narrow gauge railway called Šargan Eight which is unique in the world. Its route viewed from the sky, looks like the number eight.

Drvengrad

In addition, the well-known Serbian film director Emir Kusturica has also made a contribution to the development of tourism in Mokra Gora. In 2004, he financed the construction of an ethno village Drvengrad (Timber Town) near Mokra Gora. For this development, Kusturica received the "Philippe Rotthier European Architecture Award" from the "Brussels Foundation for Architecture".

See also
 Zlatibor mountains
 Užice-Ponikve Airport (nearby airport)
 Tornik ski resort (nearby ski resort)

References

External links
 Official site of Drvengrad

Užice
Zlatibor
Populated places in Zlatibor District
Nature parks in Serbia